Events from the year 1930 in the United States.

Incumbents

Federal Government 
 President: Herbert Hoover (R-California)
 Vice President: Charles Curtis (R-Kansas)
 Chief Justice: William Howard Taft (Ohio) (until February 3), Charles Evans Hughes (New York) (starting February 13)
 Speaker of the House of Representatives: Nicholas Longworth (R-Ohio)
 Senate Majority Leader: James Eli Watson (R-Indiana)
 Congress: 71st

Events

January–March
 January 6 
The first diesel engine automobile trip is completed (Indianapolis, Indiana, to New York City).
The first literary character licensing agreement is signed by A. A. Milne, granting Stephen Slesinger U.S. and Canadian merchandising rights to the Winnie-the-Pooh works.
 January 13 – The Mickey Mouse comic strip makes its first appearance.
 January 19–23 – Watsonville riots
 February
 Bacterol Products Company located in New York City is incorporated.
 February 18 
Elm Farm Ollie becomes the first cow to fly in an airplane, and also the first cow to be milked in an airplane.
While studying photographs taken in January, Clyde Tombaugh confirms the existence of Pluto, a heavenly body considered a planet until 2006, when the term "planet" was officially defined. Pluto is now considered a dwarf planet.
 March 6 – The first frozen foods of Clarence Birdseye go on sale in Springfield, Massachusetts.
 March 17 – The Empire State Building begins construction in New York City.
 March 20 – Colonel Sanders opens the first Kentucky Fried Chicken in North Corbin, Kentucky.
 March 31 – The Motion Pictures Production Code is instituted, imposing strict guidelines on the treatment of sex, crime, religion and violence in motion pictures for the next 40 years.

April–June

 April 3 – The 2nd Academy Awards, hosted by William C. DeMille, are presented at Ambassador Hotel in Los Angeles, with Harry Beaumont's The Broadway Melody winning the Academy Award for Best Picture. Irving Cummings and Raoul Walsh's In Old Arizona and Ernst Lubitsch's The Patriot jointly received the most nominations with five.
 April 6 – Jimmy Dewar invents Hostess Twinkies.
 April 19 – Warner Bros. in the United States release their first cartoon series, called Looney Tunes, which runs until 1969.
 April 21 – A fire in the Ohio Penitentiary near Columbus kills 320 people.
 April 22 – The United Kingdom, Japan and the United States sign the London Naval Treaty regulating submarine warfare and limiting shipbuilding.
 April 28 – The first night game in organized baseball history takes place in Independence, Kansas.
 May 10 – The National Pan-Hellenic Council is founded in Washington, D.C.
May 14 – Carlsbad Caverns National Park is established in New Mexico.
 May 15 – Aboard a Boeing tri-motor, Ellen Church becomes the first airline stewardess (the flight was from Oakland, California, to Chicago, Illinois).
 May 30 – Sergei Eisenstein arrives in Hollywood to work for Paramount Pictures; they part ways by October.
 June 9 – Chicago Tribune journalist Jake Lingle is shot in Chicago, Illinois. Newspapers promise $55,000 reward for information. Lingle is later found to have had contacts with organized crime.
 June 14 – An act of Congress establishes the Federal Bureau of Narcotics as a replacement for the Narcotics Division of the Prohibition Unit.
 June 17 – U.S. President Herbert Hoover signs the Smoot-Hawley Tariff Act into law.
 June 18 - The Bears FC is founded in Miami-Florida by William "Willy" Campbell.

July–September
 July 4 – Nation of Islam founded by Wallace Fard Muhammad in Detroit.
 July 21 – The United States Department of Veterans Affairs is established.
 July 26 – Charles Creighton and James Hargis leave New York City for Los Angeles on a roundtrip journey, driving 11,555 km using only a reverse gear; the trip lasts the next 42 days.
 July 30 – New York City station W2XBS is put in charge of NBC broadcast engineers.
 July 31 – The radio drama The Shadow airs for the first time.
 August 6 – Judge Joseph Force Crater steps into a taxi in New York City and disappears.
 August 7 – Lynching of Thomas Shipp and Abram Smith in Marion, Indiana. They are hanged; James Cameron survives. This will be the last recorded lynching of African Americans in the Northern United States.
 August 9 – Cartoon character Betty Boop premieres in the animated film Dizzy Dishes.
 September 8 – 3M introduces Scotch Tape.

October–December
 October 8 - The Philadelphia Athletics defeat the St. Louis Cardinals, 4 games to 2, to win their 5th World Series Title.
 November 4 – W9XAP in Chicago, Illinois, broadcasts the U.S. senatorial election returns, the first time a senatorial race, with non-stop vote tallies, is televised.
 November 5 – The 3rd Academy Awards, hosted by Conrad Nagel, are presented at the Ambassador Hotel in Los Angeles. Lewis Milestone's All Quiet on the Western Front wins the Academy Award for Best Picture, with Milestone winning Best Director. The film and George Hill's The Big House both received the most awards with two, while Ernst Lubitsch's The Love Parade received the most nominations with six.
 November 15 – Jean Harlow has her first major film role, in Howard Hughes' epic war film Hell's Angels. Her platinum hair and sensual persona cause an immediate sensation, turning her into one of the decade's most iconic and discussed film stars.
 December 2 – Great Depression: U.S. President Herbert Hoover goes before Congress and asks for a US$150 million public works program to help generate jobs and stimulate the economy.
 December 7 – W1XAV in Boston, Massachusetts, broadcasts video from the CBS radio orchestra program, The Fox Trappers. The broadcast also includes the first television commercial in the United States, an advertisement for I.J. Fox Furriers, who sponsored the radio show.

Undated
 A Jamaican ginger ("Jake") paralysis outbreak occurs across the South and Midwest.
 1930–1931 – Crazy Horse’s lifelong friend, He Dog, is interviewed by journalist Eleanor Hinman and Nebraska writer Mari Sandoz.
 A record drought in the eastern part of the nation sees Upper Tract, West Virginia record only  of precipitation for the year – the record lowest for a calendar year in the US east of the Mississippi. Averaged over the contiguous US the twelve months from July 1930 to June 1931 remains the driest such period on record.

Ongoing
 Lochner era (c. 1897 – c. 1937)
 U.S. occupation of Haiti (1915–1934)
 Prohibition (1920–1933)
 Great Depression (1929–1933)
 Dust Bowl (1930–1936)

Births

January

 January 1 – Ty Hardin, actor (d. 2017)
 January 2
 Julius La Rosa, pop singer (d. 2016)
 Don Rondo, singer (d. 2011)
 January 3
 Robert Loggia, actor (d. 2015)
 Barbara Stuart, actress (d. 2011
 January 4
 Sorrell Booke, actor (d. 1994)
 Don Shula, American football player and coach (d. 2020)
 January 5
 Dorothy Cotton, civil rights activist (d. 2018)
 Edward Givens, United States Air Force officer, test pilot and NASA astronaut (d. 1967)
 January 6 
 W. Wallace Cleland, biochemist and educator (d. 2013)
 Charles Kalani, Jr., wrestler and actor (d. 2000)
 Vic Tayback, actor (Alice) (d. 1990)
 January 7 
 Jack Greene, country music singer and songwriter (d. 2013)
 Eddie LeBaron, American football player, manager, and sportscaster (d. 2015)
 January 8 
 Bill James (politician), politician
 Doreen Wilber, archer (d. 2008) 
 January 10 – Roy E. Disney, film and television executive (d. 2009)
 January 12 – Glenn Yarbrough, singer (d. 2016)
 January 13 – Frances Sternhagen, actress
 January 14 – C. Arlen Beam, judge
 January 15 
 James Millstone, journalist and editor (d. 1992)
 Margaret Mary Vojtko, linguist (d. 2013)
 January 17 
 Dick Contino, American accordionist (d. 2017)
 Lucille Miller, American murderer (d. 1986) 
 January 18 – James M. Bobbitt, chemist and professor 
 January 19 – Tippi Hedren, actress
 January 20 – Buzz Aldrin, astronaut, Lunar Module Pilot on Apollo 11 and the second person to walk on the Moon
 January 22 – David Rosen (businessman), businessman
 January 23
 William R. Pogue, astronaut (d. 2014)
 Benjamin Tatar, actor (d. 2012)
 January 24
 Edward Diego Reyes, politician (d. 2018)
 Rita Lakin, screenwriter
 January 25 – Ruth Kligman, artist (d. 2010)
 January 27 – Bobby Bland, African-American singer (d. 2013)
 January 28 
 Ruth Cohen (actress), actress (d. 2008) 
 Ralph Engelstad, businessman (d. 2002) 
 January 30
 Gene Hackman, actor and novelist
 Frank O'Bannon, politician, 47th governor of Indiana (d. 2003)
 January 31 – Al De Lory, record producer, arranger, musician (d. 2012)

February

 February 2 – C. M. Newton, American basketball player, coach and administrator (d. 2018)
 February 3 – David Edward Foley, Roman Catholic prelate (d. 2018)
 February 4 – Jim Loscutoff, American basketball player (d. 2015)
 February 5 – Don Goldie, American jazz trumpeter (d. 1995) 
 February 8
 Jim Dooley, American football player and coach (d. 2008)
 Arlan Stangeland, American farmer and politician (d. 2013)
 February 10
 Anne Wexler, American political consultant and public policy advisor (d. 2009)
 Robert Wagner, American actor
 February 11 – James Polshek, American architect (d. 2022)
 February 12 
 Bert Clark, American football player and coach (d. 2004) 
 Arlen Specter, American politician (d. 2012)
 February 13 – Frank Buxton, American actor, television writer, author, and television director (d. 2018)
 February 14 – Bernie Papy Jr., American politician (d. 1995) 
 February 15 
 Sara Jane Moore, attempted assassin of President Gerald Ford
 Robert Edward Mulvee, Roman Catholic Prelate (d. 2018)
 February 16 
 Ricou Browning, stuntman and film director (d. 2023)
 Noah Weinberg, American-born Israeli rabbi, founder of Aish HaTorah (d. 2009 in Israel)
 February 17 – Roger Craig, American baseball player, coach and manager
 February 18 – Pauline Bart, American sociologist (d. 2021)
 February 19 – John Frankenheimer, American film director (d. 2002)
 February 22
 James McGarrell, American painter
 Marni Nixon, American vocalist (d. 2016) 
 February 24
 Joan Diener, American theater actress and singer (d. 2006)
 Barbara Jo Lawrence, American actress and model (d. 2013)
 Anita Steckel, American feminist artist (d. 2012)
 February 25 
 Roger A. Madigan, American politician (d. 2018)
 Delford M. Smith, American aviator (d. 2014)  
 February 26 – Robert Francis, American actor (d. 1955)
 February 27
 Barney Glaser, American sociologist
 Peter Stone, American writer (d. 2003)
 Joanne Woodward, American actress
 February 28 – Leon Cooper, American physicist, Nobel Prize laureate

March

 March 2 
 John Cullum, American actor and singer 
 Tom Wolfe, American author, journalist (d. 2018)
 March 5 – Del Crandall, American baseball player and manager (d. 2021)
 March 6 – Allison Hayes, American actress (d. 1977)
 March 9 – Ornette Coleman, American jazz saxophonist (d. 2015)
 March 13 – Liz Anderson, American country music singer, songwriter (d. 2011)
 March 16 – Olen Lovell Burrage, American native businessman (d. 2013)
 March 17 – James Irwin, American astronaut (d. 1991)
 March 18 – Adam Maida, American Roman Catholic prelate
 March 19 –
 Wayne Fitzgerald, American film title designer (d. 2019)
 Richard Wald, American television executive (d. 2022)
 March 20 – Willie Thrower, American football player (d. 2002)
 March 21 – James Coco, American actor (d. 1987)
 March 22
 Derek Bok, American lawyer and academic 
 Pat Robertson, American televangelist, motivational speaker, author and television host
 Stephen Sondheim, American composer, lyricist (d. 2021)
 March 24 – Steve McQueen, American actor (d. 1980)
 March 25 – John Keel, American journalist, urologist (d. 2009)
 March 26 – Sandra Day O'Connor, American politician, Associate Justice of the Supreme Court of the United States
 March 27 – James Tayoun, American politician (d. 2017)
 March 28
 Robert Ashley, American composer (d. 2014)
 Jerome Isaac Friedman, American physicist, Nobel Prize laureate
 Joe Fortunato, American football player (d. 2017)
 March 30 – John Astin, American actor

April

 April 1 
 Betsy Jones-Moreland, American actress (d. 2006)
 Grace Lee Whitney, American actress (Star Trek) (d. 2015)
 April 3 – Lawton Chiles, American politician (d. 1998)
 April 10 – Dolores Huerta, American labor leader and activist
 April 11
 Nicholas F. Brady, American politician
 Anton LaVey, Satanist (d. 1997)
 April 14 
 Bradford Dillman, American actor, author (d. 2018)
 Arnold Burns, American lawyer (d. 2013)
 Jay Robinson, American actor (d. 2013)
 William vanden Heuvel, lawyer and diplomat (b. 2021)
 April 19 
 Curtis Roosevelt, American writer (d. 2016)
 Dick Sargent, American actor, gay activist (d. 1994)
 April 21 – Donald J. Tyson, American businessman (d. 2011)
 April 23 – Alan Oppenheimer, American actor
 April 24 
 Richard Donner, American film director and producer (d. 2021)
 Conn Findlay, rower, Olympic champion (d. 2021)
 April 28
 James Baker, former United States Secretary of State
 Carolyn Jones, American actress (d. 1983)
 Richard C. Sarafian, American film-television director, writer and actor (d. 2013)

May

 May 1
 Ethel Ayler, American actress (d. 2018)
 Ollie Matson, American sprinter (d. 2011)
 Richard Riordan, American politician, 39th Mayor of Los Angeles
 Little Walter, African-American blues singer, musician, and songwriter (d. 1968)
 May 3
 Bob Havens, American musician
 Edward Nixon, American entrepreneur (d. 2019)
 May 4
 Lois de Banzie, UK-born American actress (d. 2021)
 Katherine Jackson, Jackson Family matriarch
 Roberta Peters, American soprano (d. 2017)
 May 5 
 Michael J. Adams, American aviator, aeronautical engineer, and astronaut (d. 1967)
 Douglas Turner Ward, American playwright, actor and director (d. 2021)
 May 6 
 George Tarasovic, American football player (d. 2019)
 David Carpenter, American serial killer 
 May 7 – Babe Parilli, American football player (d. 2017)
 May 10 
 Adam Darius, American dancer, choreographer (d. 2017)
 George E. Smith, American physicist, engineer and Nobel Prize laureate
 Pat Summerall, American football player, broadcaster (d. 2013)
 May 11
 Bud Ekins, American stuntman (d. 2007)
 William Honan, American journalist and author (d. 2014)
 May 12 – Tom Umphlett, American baseball player and manager (d. 2012)
 May 13 – Mike Gravel, American politician (d. 2021) 
 May 15 
 Cotton Ivy, American author and politician (d. 2021) 
 Jasper Johns, American painter
 May 16 – Carolyn Conwell, American actress (d. 2012) 
 May 18 – Don L. Lind, American naval aviator, astronaut and scientist (d. 2022)
 May 19 – Lorraine Hansberry, African-American playwright (d. 1965)
 May 22
 Harvey Milk, American politician, San Francisco gay rights activist (d. 1978)
 Tiny Topsy, African-American rhythm and blues singer (d. 1964)
 May 23 – Charles Kelman, ophthalmologist (d. 2004)
 May 27 
 John Barth, American writer
 Bruce Halle, American businessman (d. 2018)
 William S. Sessions, American civil servant and judge (d. 2020)
 May 28 – Frank Drake, American radio astronomer, pioneer in SETI (d. 2022)
 May 29 – Gerry Lenfest, American lawyer, media executive and philanthropist (d. 2018)
 May 30 
 Clint Eastwood, American actor, filmmaker, musician and political figure
 Morton L. Janklow, American literary agent  (d. 2022)

June

 June 1 
 Pat Corley, American actor (d. 2006)
 Richard Levins, American ecologist and geneticist (d. 2016)
 June 2
 Pete Conrad, American astronaut (d. 1999)
 Bob Lillis, American baseball player, coach and manager
 Stewart and Cyril Marcus, American gynecologists (d. 1975)
 June 3 – Marion Zimmer Bradley, American writer (d. 1999)
 June 4 – Morgana King, American jazz singer and actress (d. 2018)
 June 8 – Richard Paul Matsch, federal judge (d. 2019)
 June 10 – Grace Mirabella, American editor of Vogue (d. 2021)
 June 11 – Charles B. Rangel, African-American politician
 June 12
 Jim Nabors, American actor, musician and comedian (d. 2017)
 Dutch Rennert, baseball umpire (d. 2018)
 June 14 – Charles McCarry, American novelist (d. 2019)
 June 16 – Thyrsa Frazier Svager, African American mathematician and academic (d. 1999)
 June 17 – Shatzi Weisberger, American activist (d. 2022)
 June 19
 James O. Mason, American medical doctor and public health administrator (d. 2019)
 Gena Rowlands, American actress
 Diana Sowle, American actress (d. 2018) 
 June 21 – John E. McCarthy, Roman Catholic bishop (d. 2018) 
 June 22
 Fred Benners, American football player
 Roy Drusky, American country music singer, songwriter (d. 2004)
 June 23 – Ben Speer, American singer, musician, music publisher and record company executive (d. 2017)
 June 24
 Herb Klein, American businessman, attorney and politician
 Peter Mazzaferro, American football coach
 June 25 – James Sedin, American ice hockey player
 June 26 – Jackie Fargo, American wrestler, trainer (d. 2013)
 June 27 – Ross Perot, American computer billionaire, politician (d. 2019)
 June 28 – Maureen Howard, American writer, editor and lecturer (d. 2022)
 June 29
 Robert Evans, American producer
 Edward Johnson III, American investor, businessman
 Viola Léger, Acadian-Canadian actress and politician
 June 30
 Ben Atchley, American politician (d. 2018)
 W. C. Gorden, American football player, coach
 Isaac Levi, American philosopher
 Thomas Sowell, American economist, author

July

 July 1
 Jerome A. Cohen, professor of law at New York University School of Law
 Frank Joranko, American football and baseball player and coach (d. 2019)
 July 2
 Pete Burnside, baseball player
 Jane Moffet, utility player
 Magdalen Redman,  baseball player
 Randy Starr, dentist, singer and songwriter
 Joe Scudero, American football safety
 July 3 – Ronnell Bright, jazz pianist
 July 4
 George Steinbrenner, businessman, baseball team owner (d. 2010)
 Jack Van Mark, politician
 July 5
 Tommy Cook, actor
 Billy Howton, American football player
 Donald Wilhelms, United States Geological Survey geologist
 July 7
 Sherwin Carlquist, American botanist, photographer
 Theodore Edgar McCarrick, American Roman Catholic Cardinal
 July 8 
 Chris Adams, author and retired United States Air Force officer
 Jim Mooney, basketball player
 Frank Slay, songwriter, record producer (d. 2017)
 Jerry Vale, singer and actor (d. 2014)
 July 9 – Buddy Bregman, musical arranger (d. 2017)
 July 10 – Pete Carril, basketball coach
 July 11
 Dick Beyer, professional wrestler (d. 2019)
 Harold Bloom, literary critic (d. 2019)
 Ezra Vogel, professor (d. 2020)
 July 13 – Dick Bunt, basketball player
 July 14 – Polly Bergen, American actress (d. 2014)
 July 15 – Betty Wagoner, American baseball player (d. 2006)
 July 16
 Michael Bilirakis, politician
 Bert Rechichar, American football defensive back, kicker (d. 2019)
 July 18 – Sammy Masters, singer-songwriter (d. 2013)
 July 20 – Ronnie MacGilvray, American basketball player (d. 2007)
 July 23 – Moon Landrieu, lawyer and politician, Mayor of New Orleans (d. 2022)
 July 29 – Paul Taylor, choreographer (d. 2018)
 July 30
 A. D. King, civil rights activist and minister (d. 1969)
 Gus Triandos, baseball player (Baltimore Orioles) (d. 2013)

August

 August 2
 Eddie Locke, American jazz drummer (d. 2009)
 Carolyn Warner, American politician (d. 2018)
 August 5
 Neil Armstrong, American astronaut, mission commander on Apollo 11 and the first person to walk on the Moon (d. 2012)
 Damita Jo DeBlanc, American actress, comedian, singer (d. 1998)
 August 6 – Abbey Lincoln, American singer (d. 2010)
 August 8 – Joan Mondale, American socialite, Second Lady of the United States (d. 2014)
 August 10 – Fakir Musafar, American performance artist, body modification pioneer (d. 2018)
 August 13
 Don Ho, American singer, musician (d. 2007)
 Bob Wiesler, American pitcher (d. 2014)
 Jack Daugherty, American musician (d. 1991)
 Wilmer Mizell, American left-handed pitcher (d. 1999)
 August 14
 W. Brantley Harvey Jr., American lawyer and politician (d. 2018)
 Earl Weaver, American professional baseball player, manager (d. 2013)
 August 15 – Selma James, American-born feminist writer
 August 16
 Robert Culp, American actor (d. 2010)
 Frank Gifford, American football player (d. 2015)
 August 21 – Frank Perry, American stage director and filmmaker (d. 1995)
 August 23 – Mickey McMahan, big band musician (d. 2008)
 August 28 – Ben Gazzara, American actor (d. 2012)
 August 30 – Warren Buffett, American billionaire entrepreneur
 August 31 – Raymond J. Donovan, American businessman and politician, Secretary of Labor (d. 2021)

September
 

 September 2 – Rita Riggs, American costume designer (d. 2017)
 September 4 – Norman Dorsen, American civil rights activist (d. 2017)
 September 7 – Sonny Rollins, African-American jazz saxophonist
 September 9 – Frank Lucas, African-American drug trafficker
 September 11 – Cathryn Damon, American actress (d. 1987)
 September 13 – Mary Baumgartner, American female professional baseball player (d. 2018)
 September 16 – Anne Francis, American actress (d. 2011)
 September 17
 David Huddleston, American actor (The Big Lebowski) (d. 2016)
 Edgar Mitchell, American astronaut (d. 2016)
 Thomas P. Stafford, American astronaut
 September 23 – Ray Charles, African-American singer, musician and actor (d. 2004)
 September 24 – John Young, American astronaut (d. 2018)
 September 25 – Shel Silverstein, American poet, singer-songwriter, cartoonist, screenwriter and children's book author (d. 1999)
 September 26 – Philip Bosco, American actor (d. 2018)
 September 28
 Tommy Collins, American country music singer-songwriter (d. 2000)
 Johnny "Country" Mathis, American country music singer-songwriter (d. 2011)
 September 29 – Billy Strange, American singer-songwriter and guitarist (d. 2012)

October

 October 1  – George F. Regas, Episcopal priest, activist and rector of All Saints Episcopal Church, Pasadena, California (1967–95) (d. 2021)
 October 10
 Doris Payne, jewel thief 
 Adlai Stevenson III, politician (d. 2021)
 October 11
 Bill Fischer, baseball player (d. 2018) 
 Sam Johnson, politician (d. 2020)
 October 17 
 Robert Atkins, nutritionist (d. 2003)
 Nick Chickillo, American football player (d. 2000)
 October 18 – Frank Carlucci, politician (d. 2018)
 October 19 – Jody Lawrance, actress (d. 1986)
 October 20 – Leila Seth, Indian judge (d. 2017)
 October 24 
 Big Bopper, disc jockey, singer and songwriter (d. 1959)
 Jack Angel, voice actor 
 October 29 – Natalie Sleeth, composer (d. 1992)
 October 30 – Clifford Brown, jazz trumpeter (d. 1956)
 October 31 – Michael Collins, astronaut (d. 2021)

November

 November 3
 Mable John, American blues singer (d. 2022)
 D. James Kennedy, American evangelist (d. 2007)
 November 4 – Dick MacPherson, American football coach (d. 2017)
 November 6
 Derrick Bell, American law professor (d. 2011)
 Wilma Briggs, American female baseball player
 November 7 – Rudy Boschwitz, American politician
 November 11 – Mildred Dresselhaus, American scientist, educator (d. 2017)
 November 12 – Bob Crewe, American singer, songwriter, manager, and producer (d. 2014)
 November 13
 Richard A. Falk, American international professor
 Fred R. Harris, American politician
 November 14 – Ed White, American astronaut (d. 1967)
 November 16 – Paul Foytack, American baseball player (d. 2021)
 November 17 – Bob Mathias, American athlete (d. 2006)
 November 20 – Curly Putman, American songwriter (d. 2016)
 November 21 – Anthony Downs, American economist (d. 2021)
 November 22 – Owen Garriott, American astronaut (d. 2019)
 November 23 
 Bill Brock, American politician (d. 2021)
 Robert Easton, American actor (d. 2011)
 Jack McKeon, American baseball player and manager
 November 24 – Bob Friend, American baseball player (d. 2019)
 November 25 – Clarke Scholes, American freestyle swimmer (d. 2010)
 November 30 – G. Gordon Liddy, American organizer of the Watergate burglaries (d. 2021)

December

 December 2 – Gary Becker, American economist, Nobel Prize laureate (d. 2014)
 December 4
 Sheila Benson, American journalist and film critic (d. 2022)
 Jim Hall, American jazz guitarist (d. 2013)
 December 5 – Warren Spannaus, American politician (d. 2017)
 December 11 – Jim Williams, American antique dealer, preservationist (d. 1990)
 December 19 – Peter Buck, American restaurateur (d. 2021)
 December 31
 Odetta, African-American singer and civil rights activist (d. 2008)
 Jaime Escalante, American high school math teacher (d. 2010)

Deaths 
January 9 – Edward Bok, author (b. 1863)
 January 24 – Rebecca Latimer Felton, U.S. Senator from Georgia (b. 1835)
 February 7 – Jennie Anderson Froiseth, women's rights campaigner (b. 1849)
 February 14 – Fred Dubois, U.S. Senator from Idaho (b. 1851)
 February 27 – George Haven Putnam, author and publisher (b. 1844)
 March 8 – William Howard Taft, 27th President of the United States from 1909 to 1913 and 10th Chief Justice of the United States from 1921 to 1930 (b. 1857)
 March 11 – Alma Webster Hall Powell, opera singer, suffragist, and inventor (b. 1869)
March 13 – Mary Eleanor Wilkins Freeman, author (b. 1852)
 March 31 – James Marshall Head, politician and businessman (b. 1855)
 April 7 – Octaviano Ambrosio Larrazolo, politician (b. 1859)
 April 14 – John B. Sheridan, Irish-American sports journalist (b, 1870 in Ireland)
 May 2 – Daniel V. Asay, iceboat racer (b. 1847)
 May 18 – Gottfried Blocklinger, admiral (b. 1847)
 June 16  – Ezra Fitch, businessman, co-founder of Abercrombie & Fitch (b. 1865)
 July 2 – Anders Randolf, silent film actor (b. 1870 in Denmark)
 August 6 – Luigi Fugazy, banker, businessman and philanthropist (b. 1839 in Italy)
 September 5 – Robert Means Thompson, naval officer and president of the American Olympic Association (b. 1849)
 September 21 – John T. Dorrance, chemist (b. 1873)
 September 24 – William A. MacCorkle, lawyer, Governor of West Virginia (b. 1857)
 September 28 – Daniel Guggenheim, mining magnate and philanthropist (b. 1856)
 October 2 – Gordon Stewart Northcott, serial killer (executed; b. 1906)
 October 15 – Herbert Henry Dow, industrial chemist (b. 1866 in Canada)
 November 20 – William B. Hanna, sportswriter (b. 1866)
 December 9 – Rube Foster, Negro league baseball player (b. 1879)
 December 14 – F. Richard Jones, director (b. 1893)
 December 16 – Herman Lamm, bank robber (suicide; b. 1890 in Germany)

Date unknown 
 May - Anna Margaret Urbas, New York City murder victim in a criminal dispute (b. 1905/1906)

See also
 1930 in American television
 List of American films of 1930
 Timeline of United States history (1930–1949)

References

External links
 

 
1930s in the United States
United States
United States
Years of the 20th century in the United States